Tephritis frauenfeldi is a species of tephritid or fruit flies in the genus Tephritis of the family Tephritidae.

Distribution
Austria, Slovakia, Hungary, Romania, north Italy, Albania, Turkey.

References

Tephritinae
Insects described in 1927
Diptera of Europe
Diptera of Asia